The 1970 John Player League was the second competing of what was generally known as the Sunday League.  The competition was won for the second consecutive year by Lancashire County Cricket Club.

Standings

Batting averages

Bowling averages

See also
Sunday League

References

John Player
Pro40